Curtis Harry (born 23 May 1962) is a Trinidad and Tobago bobsledder. He competed at the 1994 Winter Olympics and the 1998 Winter Olympics. He was also the flag bearer for Trinidad and Tobago at the 1998 Winter Olympics.

References

External links
 

1962 births
Living people
Trinidad and Tobago male bobsledders
Olympic bobsledders of Trinidad and Tobago
Bobsledders at the 1994 Winter Olympics
Bobsledders at the 1998 Winter Olympics
Sportspeople from Port of Spain